MiG Alley is a combat flight simulation game, developed by Rowan Software for PCs with Windows, and was published by Empire Interactive in 1999.

Description 
MiG Alley is a historical simulation which focuses on early jet fighter combat in the Korean War – specifically, the so-called MiG Alley in northwestern North Korea, for which the game is named. One of the interesting aspects of the game is the closeness in overall performance between the main combat fighter aircraft – the MiG-15 and the F-86 Sabre. Another is that the game was one of the earliest in the genre to incorporate a 'dynamic' campaign, in which the player's missions are influenced by in-game events rather than being presented in a predetermined order.

History 
MiG Alley was developed by Rowan Software and published by Empire Interactive in 1999. In 2001, when Rowan was shut down by Empire Interactive, the developers released the source code to allow the community to continue the game's support on their own. The release happened with permission from Empire Interactive under the "Empire Interactive License", and didn't include the textures and landscape detailing.

Reception

The game received favorable reviews according to the review aggregation website GameRankings. Christian A. O'Brien of Next Generation called it "a fine sim with terrific graphics and a great sense of campaign flow. There's something here for just about everyone".

In the United States, the game sold 4,171 copies during 1999, after its release on November 30 of that year. Jason Ocampo of CNET Gamecenter wrote that it "tanked at retail".

The game was a finalist for the Academy of Interactive Arts & Sciences' 1999 "Simulation Game of the Year" award, which ultimately went to Microsoft Flight Simulator 2000. However, it was named the best simulation of 1999 by Computer Gaming World, PC Gamer US, CNET Gamecenter, Computer Games Strategy Plus and GameSpot. PC Gamer US highlighted the game's "outstanding flight modeling, butter-smooth graphics, and rich dynamic campaign structure".

References

External links

 MiG Alley at rowansoftware.com (archived in 2000)

1999 video games
Cold War video games
Combat flight simulators
Commercial video games with freely available source code
Korean War video games
Video games developed in the United Kingdom
Video games with historical settings
Video games set in Korea
Windows games
Windows-only games
Empire Interactive games
Rowan Software games
Single-player video games